McKinley is an unincorporated community in Highland Township, Elk County, Pennsylvania, United States.

Notes

Unincorporated communities in Elk County, Pennsylvania
Unincorporated communities in Pennsylvania